Hat Pak is a commune in Veun Sai District in northeast Cambodia. It contains three villages and has a population of 978. In the 2007 commune council elections, four seats went to members of the Cambodian People's Party and one seat went to a member of Funcinpec.

Villages

References

Communes of Ratanakiri province